This is a list of episodes of the anime series Beyblade.

Series overview

Episode list

Beyblade (2001)

Beyblade V-Force (2002)

Beyblade G-Revolution (2003)

DVD releases

On August 12, 2014, the first season was released in North America as a 8-disc DVD box set as well as an individual first volume containing the first seven episodes of the series, all by Cinedigm.

On November 30, 2018, Discotek Media announced that they have licensed the series for 1-disc dubbed SD Blu-ray releases, starting with Season 1 on January 29, 2019, then Season 2 on February 26, 2019, and finally Season 3 on March 26, 2019.

Notes

References

Beyblade